Events from the year 1958 in Denmark.

Incumbents
 Monarch – Frederick IX
 Prime minister – H. C. Hansen

Events

Sports

Badminton
 1923 March  All England Badminton Championships
 Erland Kops wins gold in Men's Single
 Erland Kops and Poul-Erik Nielsen win gold in Men's Double

Date unknown
 Emile Severeyns (BEL) and Rik Van Steenbergen (BEL) win the Six Days of Copenhagen sox-day track cycling race.

Births
 26 March – Michael Madsen, light-heavyweight boxer
 4 April – Morten Frost, badminton player
 22 April – Jesper Garnell, boxer
 11 June – Nille Juul-Sørensen, architect

Deaths
 11 March – Ole Kirk Christiansen, entrepreneur and businessman, inventor of Lego (born 1891)
 14 March – Marius Lefèrve, gymnast, Olympic silver medalist in team, Swedish system, in 1912 (born 1875)
 24 June – Ole Bendixen, explorer, merchant and author (born 1869)
 12 July – Gudmund Schütte, philologist and historian (born 1872)
 18 September – William Thalbitzer, philologist, professor of Eskimo studies at the University of Copenhagen (born 1873)
 28 September – Henrik Malberg, theater and cinema actor (born 1873)
 4 December – Emilie Demant Hatt, artist, writer and ethnographer (born 1873)

See also
1958 in Danish television

References

 
Denmark
Years of the 20th century in Denmark
1950s in Denmark